The 2021 Hockey East Men's Ice Hockey Tournament was played between March 10 and March 20, 2021. Due to the COVID-19 pandemic, all games were played on campus locations, rather than the semifinal and final match traditionally being hosted at the TD Garden in Boston, Massachusetts. The UMass Minutemen defeated the UMass Lowell River Hawks to earn their 1st Hockey East tournament championship, and earned the conference's automatic bid into the 2021 NCAA Division I Men's Ice Hockey Tournament.

The tournament was the 36th in league history.

Format
Due to the difficulties of scheduling during the regular season, it was announced in late 2020 that all 11 Hockey East teams qualified for the tournament. After further complications and cancellations throughout the season, a formula-based ranking system called the Hockey East Power Index (HEPI) was implemented to determine seeding. Additionally, the tournament was formatted so that all rounds would be single-elimination games, rather than traditionally a best-of-three series in the opening and quarterfinals rounds. 

On March 5, it was announced that Merrimack would be unable to participate in the tournament due to a late positive test result among the team's Tier-I personnel. As a result, the 11-team tournament format was reduced to a 10-team format, and teams ranked below Merrimack in the final HEPI standings would move up a seed to compensate. 

Seeds 7-10 will play a single elimination opening round game on March 10, 2021, as seeds 1-6 will earn a bye to the next round. Winning teams will be reseeded and then play a single elimination quarterfinal game on March 14, 2021. Following an additional reseeding, the four victorious teams will advance to the semifinals on March 17, 2021. The final two programs will battle in the championship game on March 20, 2021.

Standings

Bracket
Teams are reseeded after the Opening Round and Quarterfinals

Note: * denotes overtime period(s)

Results

Opening Round

(7) UMass Lowell vs. (11) Vermont

(8) Maine vs. (9) New Hampshire

Quarterfinals

(2) Boston University vs. (7) UMass Lowell

(4) Connecticut vs. (5) Providence

(3) Massachusetts vs. (6) Northeastern

(1) Boston College vs. (9) New Hampshire

Semifinals

(1) Boston College vs. (7) UMass Lowell

(3) Massachusetts vs. (5) Providence

Finals

(3) Massachusetts vs. (7) UMass Lowell

Tournament Awards

All-Tournament Team
Goaltender – Filip Lindberg, Massachusetts
Defenceman – Anthony Baxter, UMass Lowell
Defenceman – Zac Jones, Massachusetts
Forward – Matt Brown, UMass Lowell
Forward – Jake Gaudet, Massachusetts
Forward – Bobby Trivigno, Massachusetts

Tournament MVP
Bobby Trivigno, Massachusetts

References

External links
2021 Hockey East Men's Ice Hockey Tournament

Hockey East Men's Ice Hockey Tournament
Hockey East Men's Ice Hockey Tournament
College sports in Massachusetts
Ice hockey in Boston
Hockey East Men's Ice Hockey Tournament
Hockey East Men's Ice Hockey Tournament
Hockey East Men's Ice Hockey Tournament